Arthur Land District is one of the twenty land districts of Tasmania which are part of the Cadastral divisions of Tasmania. It was formerly one of the 18 counties of Tasmania. It is bordered by the Gordon River to the north-west, the Huon River to the north-east, and the Picton River to the east. It includes the Arthur Range.

Land Districts of Tasmania
South West Tasmania